Kirua Vunjo Magharibi is a town and ward in the Moshi Rural district of Kilimanjaro Region, Tanzania. Its population according to the 2012 census was 12,840.

References

Wards of Kilimanjaro Region